Trinity Methodist Episcopal Church is a historic Methodist Episcopal church located at 185 Boulevard NE in Orangeburg, Orangeburg County, South Carolina.   It was built between 1928 and 1944 and is a two-story, brick Late Gothic Revival-style church building on a raised basement. It features a large Tudor arched stained glass window with molded cast stone surround.

It was added to the National Register of Historic Places in 1994.

References

Methodist churches in South Carolina
Churches on the National Register of Historic Places in South Carolina
Gothic Revival church buildings in South Carolina
Churches completed in 1944
Churches in Orangeburg County, South Carolina
African-American history of South Carolina
National Register of Historic Places in Orangeburg County, South Carolina